Acajete Municipality may refer to:

 Acajete Municipality, Puebla, Mexico
 Acajete Municipality, Veracruz, Mexico

Municipality name disambiguation pages